Lacta is the name of two chocolate-manufacturing companies. It may refer to:

Lacta (Brazilian company)
Lacta (Greek company)